This page is a list of the hat-tricks scored for the Hungary national football team. Since Hungary's first international association football match in 1920, there have been 73 occasions when a Hungarian player has scored three or more goals (a hat-trick) in a game. The first hat-trick was scored by József Horváth against Bohemia on 7 April 1907. The record for the most goals scored in an international game by a Hungarian player is seven, which has been achieved on just one occasion: by György Sárosi against Austria in 1937, at the 1936–38 Central European International Cup.

Sándor Kocsis, Flórián Albert and László Kiss are the only Hungarian players to have scored a hat-trick at the world cup finals, with Sándor Kocsis doing it twice (including a poker) at the 1954 World Cup against South Korea and eventual champions West Germany. Two players have scored a hat-trick for the losing side: József Takács (3–5, 1930); and Ferenc Szusza (3–4, 1947).

Hat-tricks scored by Hungary

Hat-tricks conceded by Hungary

Statistics

The following table lists the number of hat-tricks scored by Hungarianplayers who have scored two or more hat-tricks.

See also 
 Hungary national football team results (2010-19)

References 

Hat-tricks
Hungary
Hungary